Pablo Pereira may refer to:

 Pablo Pereira (volleyball) (born 1974), Argentine volleyball player
 Pablo Pereira (footballer, born 1985), Uruguayan football defender
 Pablo Pereira (footballer, born 1986), Uruguayan football forward

See also
 Paulo Pereira (disambiguation)
 Paula Pereira (disambiguation)